Farfugium is a genus of flowering plants in the family Asteraceae, native to streams and seashores in east Asia.  They are rhizomatous evergreen perennials with rounded leathery leaves and bright yellow flowers in autumn and winter. Species include Farfugium japonicum, with variegated cultivars for use in horticulture.

 Species
 Farfugium hiberniflorum (Makino) Kitam. - Kyushu
 Farfugium japonicum (L.) Kitam. - China, Korea, Japan (incl Nansei-shoto + Ogasawara-shoto)

References

Senecioneae
Asteraceae genera
Flora of Eastern Asia
Flora of China